Misty is a solo album by pianist Harold Mabern which was originally released on the Venus label in Japan in 2007.

Reception

The Allmusic review by Ken Dryden stated that "This solo piano date is one of his very best efforts".

Track listing 
All compositions by Harold Mabern except where noted
 "Dat Dere" (Bobby Timmons) – 4:52
 "She" (George Shearing) – 4:31
 "Smoke Gets in Your Eyes" (Jerome Kern, Otto Harbach) – 4:14
 "Mabern's Boogie" – 2:32
 "The Way We Were" (Marvin Hamlisch, Alan Bergman, Marilyn Bergman) – 5:10
 "Unforgettable" (Irving Gordon) – 4:19
 "You Don't Know What Love Is" (Gene de Paul, Don Raye) – 3:51
 "A Child Is Born" (Thad Jones) – 5:18
 "Wail Bait" (Quincy Jones) – 3:45
 "Stolen Moments" (Oliver Nelson) – 4:18
 "Wayne's Blues" – 3:59
 "Misty" (Erroll Garner) – 4:54

Personnel 
 Harold Mabern – piano

References

2007 albums
Venus Records albums
Harold Mabern albums